Manamedu is a village in Bahour Commune of Bahour taluk  in the Union Territory of Puducherry, India. It is one of the 11 Enclaves of Puducherry. Manmedu serves as a gateway to Pondicherry - Nellikuppam route. It lies on the banks of Pennaiyar River

History
The name Manamedu means high area on the banks of a river. Manalmedu is being called as Manamedu.

Geography
Manamedu is connected to Bahour, its Commune Headquarters by Frontier Road (RC-21). A bridge is being constructed across Pennaiyar River at Manamedu. Upon its completion, Manamedu will serve has a vital point on the Pondicherry–Nellikuppam route.

Villages
Manamedu village panchayat consist of

 Manamedu
 Kaduvanur

Politics
Manamedu is a part of Nettapakkam (Union Territory Assembly constituency) which comes under Puducherry (Lok Sabha constituency)

Gallery

References

External links
Official website of the Government of the Union Territory of Puducherry

Villages in Puducherry district